John Calvin Portman Jr. (December 4, 1924 – December 29, 2017) was an American neofuturistic architect and real estate developer widely known for popularizing hotels and office buildings with multi-storied interior atria. Portman also had a particularly large impact on the cityscape of his hometown of Atlanta, with the Peachtree Center complex serving as downtown's business and tourism anchor from the 1970s onward. The Peachtree Center area includes Portman-designed Hyatt, Westin, and Marriott hotels. Portman's plans typically deal with primitives in the forms of symmetrical squares and circles.

Early life and career
Portman was born to John C. Portman, Sr. and Edna Rochester Portman. He had five sisters. He graduated from the Georgia Institute of Technology in 1950. His firm completed the Merchandise Mart (now AmericasMart) in downtown Atlanta in 1961. The multi-block Peachtree Center was begun in 1965 and would expand to become the main center of hotel and office space in Downtown Atlanta, taking over from the Five Points area just to the south. Portman would develop a similar multiblock complex at San Francisco's Embarcadero Center (1970s), which unlike its Atlanta counterpart, heavily emphasized pedestrian activity at street level.

The Hyatt Regency Atlanta, Portman's first atrium hotel, would lead to many more iconic hotels and multi-use complexes with atria, including the Westin Bonaventure Hotel in Los Angeles (1974–1976), the New York Marriott Marquis (1982–1985), and the Renaissance Center in Detroit (first phase 1973–1977), whose central tower remained the tallest hotel in the Western Hemisphere until the completion of 1717 Broadway in 2013.

His signature work in China, the Shanghai Centre (1990), was the first of many major projects in China and elsewhere in Asia. The 5-star hotel inside, The Portman Ritz-Carlton, Shanghai (formerly Portman Shangri-La Hotel), was named after him.

In 2009 Portman's work was featured in a major exhibition at Atlanta's High Museum of Art.

Portman was a Fellow of the American Institute of Architects.

Personal life
Portman married Joan "Jan" Newton. They had six children.

Portman died on December 29, 2017, aged 93. He was survived, among others, by his wife and five of his children, as well as his daughter-in-law, actress Traylor Howard, and three of his five siblings.

Portfolio

In chronological order by first listed completion date — for complexes, by completion date of first building in complex

An asterisk (*) following a listing indicates a work done in partnership with H. Griffith Edwards.

1960s
AmericasMart (formerly the Atlanta Market Center), Atlanta
AmericasMart 1 (also known as the Merchandise Mart), 1961*
AmericasMart 2 (also known as the Gift Mart), 1992
AmericasMart 2 West, 2008
AmericasMart 3 (also known as the Apparel Mart), 1979
Atlanta Decorative Arts Center (ADAC), Peachtree Hills, Atlanta, 1961
Cary Reynolds Elementary (formerly Sequoyah Elementary and Northwoods Area Elementary before that), 1961
Sequoyah Middle School (formerly Sequoyah High School), 1963 
230 Peachtree Building (formerly the Peachtree Center Tower), Atlanta, 1965*
Antoine Graves, Atlanta, 1965*
Antoine Graves Annex, Atlanta, 1966*
Henderson High School, Chamblee, 1967*
Peachtree Center, Atlanta
Peachtree Center North (formerly the Atlanta Gas Light Tower), 1967*
Peachtree Center South, 1969
Peachtree Center International Tower (formerly the Peachtree Cain Building), 1972*
Harris Tower, 1975*
Marquis One, 1985
Marquis Two, 1989
Hyatt Regency Atlanta (formerly the Regency Hyatt House), 1967*
Hyatt Regency O'Hare, Rosemont, 1969

1970s
BlueCross BlueShield of Tennessee (now The Westin Chattanooga Hotel), Chattanooga, 1971
Embarcadero Center, San Francisco
One Embarcadero Center (formerly the Security Pacific Tower), 1971
Two Embarcadero Center, 1974
Three Embarcadero Center (formerly the Levi Strauss Building), 1977
Four Embarcadero Center, 1982
Hyatt Regency San Francisco (also known as Five Embarcadero Center), 1973
Embarcadero West, 1989
Le Méridien San Francisco (formerly the Park Hyatt San Francisco), 1988
The Mall at Peachtree Center, Atlanta, 1973
The Tower (formerly the Block 82 Tower, Bank One Tower, Team Bank, Texas American Bank, and Fort Worth National Bank Building), Fort Worth, 1969–1974
Westin Peachtree Plaza Hotel, Atlanta, 1976
Westin Bonaventure Hotel, Los Angeles, 1974–1976
Renaissance Center, Detroit
Detroit Marriott at the Renaissance Center (formerly the Detroit Plaza Hotel, The Westin Hotel Renaissance Center Detroit), 1973–1977
Renaissance Center Tower 100, 1973–1977
Renaissance Center Tower 200, 1973–1977
Renaissance Center Tower 300, 1973–1977
Renaissance Center Tower 400, 1973–1977
Renaissance Center Tower 500, 1979–1981
Renaissance Center Tower 600, 1979–1981

1980s
The Regent Singapore (formerly the Pavilion InterContinental Hotel), Singapore, 1982
George W. Woodruff Physical Education Center, Emory University, 1983
Peachtree Center Athletic Club, Atlanta, 1985
Atlanta Marriott Marquis, 1985
 Hyatt Regency Jeju, Jungmun, Jeju-do, South Korea, 1985
Marina Square, Singapore
Marina Square Shopping Centre, 1985
Mandarin Oriental Singapore, 1985
Marina Mandarin Singapore, 1985
The Pan Pacific Singapore, 1986
Entelechy II, Sea Island, 1986
New York Marriott Marquis, New York City, 1982–1985
R. Howard Dobbs University Center, Emory University, 1986 (to be demolished)
Northpark Town Center, Sandy Springs
Northpark 400, 1986
Northpark 500, 1989
Northpark 600, 1998
JW Marriott San Francisco Union Square (formerly the Pan Pacific San Francisco and Portman Hotel), 1987
American Cancer Society Center (formerly the Inforum Technology Center), Atlanta, 1989
Riverwood 100 (formerly the Barnett Bank Building), Vinings, 1989

1990s
Shanghai Centre, Shanghai, China, 1990
Shanghai Centre West Apartment (also known as the Exhibition Centre North Apartment 1)
Shanghai Centre Apartments 2 (also known as the Shanghai East Apartment)
The Portman Ritz-Carlton, Shanghai (formerly the Shanghai Centre Main Tower and Portman Shangri-La Hotel)
SunTrust Plaza (formerly One Peachtree Center), Atlanta, 1992
Cap Square (short for Capital Square), Kuala Lumpur, Malaysia
Menara Multi Purpose (also known as the Capital Square Tower 1), 1994
Capital Square Condominiums, 2007

2000s
Bank of Communications, Shanghai, China, 2000
Shi Liu Pu Building (also known as the Bank of Telecommunications), Shanghai, China, 2000
Bund Center, Shanghai, China, 2002
Bund Center (also known as the Shanghai Golden Beach Tower)
The Westin Bund Center, Shanghai
Westin Residences
Westin Warsaw Hotel, Warsaw, Poland, 2001–2003
Beijing Yintai Centre (also known as the Silvertie Center), Beijing, China, 2002–2007
Beijing Yintai Centre Tower 1
Beijing Yintai Centre Tower 2
Beijing Yintai Centre Tower 3
The Westin Charlotte, Charlotte, 2003
Tomorrow Square (contains the JW Marriott Hotel Shanghai at Tomorrow Square), Shanghai, China, 1997–2003
Taj Wellington Mews Luxury Residences, Mumbai, India, 2004
Renaissance Schaumburg Convention Center Hotel, Schaumburg, 2006
ICON, San Diego, 2004–2007
Hilton San Diego Bayfront (also known as the Hilton San Diego Convention Center Hotel and Campbell Shipyard Hilton), San Diego, 2006–2008
JW Marriott Hotel Shenzhen Bao'an, Shenzhen, China, 2015
CODA Tech Square, Atlanta, Georgia, Georgia Institute of Technology, Midtown Atlanta, 2017

Awards and honors
 1968 Golden Plate Award of the American Academy of Achievement
 1978 Medal for Innovations in Hotel Design – American Institute of Architects
 1980 Silver Medal Award for Innovative Design – American Institute of Architects, Atlanta Chapter
 1984 Urban Land Institute Award for Excellence – for Embarcadero Center
 2009 The Lynn S. Beedle Lifetime Achievement Award – Council on Tall Buildings and Urban Habitat
 2011 The Atlanta City Council renamed Harris Street in Downtown Atlanta as John Portman Boulevard at Historic Harris Street.
 2013 Four Pillar Award – Council for Quality Growth

Criticism
Portman was praised for his "cinematic" interiors artfully relating interior space and elements to the individual. In the 1960s and 1970s the placement of such buildings in America's decaying downtowns was considered salvation of the city centers, but some contemporary city planners are critical of such insular environments that "turn their back" on the city streets. For example, the New York Marriott Marquis with its 8-floor high lobby was praised as a "town square", but is now criticized by some for turning its back to Times Square. Nonetheless, at the time the hotel was built, due to the still-seedy character of Times Square, Portman's style of inwardly-oriented spaces made logical sense. Also, he did, in fact, design buildings (like San Francisco's Embarcadero Center) that heavily emphasized pedestrian activity at street level.

Bibliography

References

External links

  Portmanusa.com: website of the Portman architectural firm
 Portmanholdings.com: website of the Portman real estate development firm
  Johnportmanfilm.com: 'John Portman: A Life of Building' — film about Portman's life and works, aired on PBS stations in June 2013.

1924 births
2017 deaths
 
American architects
Modernist architects
Postmodern architects
Neo-futurism architecture
American real estate businesspeople
Real estate and property developers
Architects from Atlanta
Architects from South Carolina
Georgia Tech alumni
History of Atlanta
People from Walhalla, South Carolina